Augenijus Vaškys is a retired Lithuanian professional basketball player. He has played professionally in Lithuania, Israel, Poland, Estonia and Finland. Vaskys' most successful seasons include playing in Poland in Czarni Slupsk as well in Estonia in Tartu Ülikool/Rock. Was the coach of the Estonian basketball team KK Valga.

Honours
 Lithuanian League
 Runner-up: 1996–97
 Third place: 2005–06
 Estonian League: 2003–04
 Runner-up: 2004–05
 Estonian Cup: 2004
 Finnish League
 Runner-up: 2006–07
 Baltic League
 Third place: 2005–06

References

External links
Profile  at basketpedya.com

1972 births
Living people
Bnei Hertzeliya basketball players
Israeli Basketball Premier League players
Lithuanian expatriate basketball people in Estonia
Lithuanian expatriate basketball people in Israel
Lithuanian men's basketball players
Point guards
Tartu Ülikool/Rock players
Korvpalli Meistriliiga players
Lithuanian expatriate basketball people in Poland